Axel Axelsson (born 25 July 1951) is an Icelandic former handball player who competed in the 1972 Summer Olympics.

References

1951 births
Living people
Axel Axelsson
Axel Axelsson
Handball players at the 1972 Summer Olympics